Hypodoxa viridicoma is a moth of the family Geometridae first described by William Warren in 1899. It is found on the Solomon Islands.

References

Moths described in 1899
Pseudoterpnini